Moses Powell (1941–2005), also known as Master Musa Muhammad, was an American pioneer of martial arts in the United States. He was born in Norfolk Virginia. He held the rank of 10th degree black belt, and was famous for his one finger forward roll. Moses Powell was the first martial artist invited to perform a demonstration in front of the United Nations.  One of the first African Americans to instruct the DEA, FBI, and the Secret Service in martial arts.  He was also a featured demonstrator New York's World Fair in 1965. Notable for being a black martial artist (of minority ethnicity in the United States), he served as an instructor to movie star Wesley Snipes.  He appeared in the documentary, the Warrior Within., along with Kevin Leon Evans Chuck Norris.  He was also the founder of the Sanuces Ryu Jujutsu system.

Media appearances
Moses Powell appeared on the cover of Official Karate Magazine in September 1973, Spring 1982, and February 1976. He was covered in Legends of American Martial Arts (DVD) 

Moses was also noted in the book Unlocking The Healing Powers in Your Hands: The 18 Mudra System of Qigong as a master of Jujitsu.

References

American martial artists
1941 births
2005 deaths
Martial arts school founders
20th-century philanthropists